Daniel Rincón was the reigning champion, but is no longer eligible to participate in junior events.

Martín Landaluce won the title, defeating Gilles-Arnaud Bailly in the final, 7–6(7–3), 5–7, 6–2.

Seeds

Main draw

Finals

Top half

Section 1

Section 2

Bottom half

Section 3

Section 4

Qualifying

Seeds

Qualifiers

Lucky loser
  Calvin Baierl

Draw

First qualifier

Second qualifier

Third qualifier

Fourth qualifier

Fifth qualifier

Sixth qualifier

Seventh qualifier

Eighth qualifier

References

External links 
 Draw at ITFtennis.com
 Main draw at usopen.com
 Qualifying draw at usopen.com

Boys' Singles
2022